Jonathan Osorio (born June 12, 1992) is a Canadian professional soccer player who plays as a midfielder for Major League Soccer club Toronto FC and the Canada national team. He holds the Toronto FC club record for most appearances. Osorio also made three appearances for Canada in the 2022 FIFA World Cup.

Early life 
Osorio began playing soccer with the Brampton Youth Soccer at age 10. When he was 15, he moved to Clarkson Sheridan SC and graduated from St. Edmund Campion Secondary School. In 2010, he went to Uruguay to play with Nacional's academy, where he played with his future teammate on the Canada national team Lucas Cavallini.

Club career

SC Toronto 
Osorio began his career with SC Toronto in the Canadian Soccer League in 2012, where he had a successful season finishing as the club's second highest goalscorer, and helped Toronto finish third in the overall standings, which secured a postseason berth for the club. He featured in the playoff quarterfinal match against the Serbian White Eagles, but were eliminated from playoff contention after losing the match by a score of 1–0. For his successful debut season he was awarded the CSL Rookie of the Year.

Toronto FC 

Osorio has been with TFC first team since 2013. He began training with the Toronto FC Academy in September 2012 and was invited to train with the First Team, during the preseason, impressing coach Ryan Nelsen and earning a first team contract. Osorio made his debut for Toronto FC in Major League Soccer on March 9, 2013, against Sporting Kansas City, coming on for Terry Dunfield. He scored his first goal against the Los Angeles Galaxy in a substitute appearance, in the 78th minute, on March 30, 2013. Osorio scored his second goal against New York Red Bulls on April 27 after coming on in the final eleven minutes as a sub he was able to equalize the game; however, the match finished in a 2–1 defeat with Tim Cahill scoring the winning goal. He was awarded MLS Goal of the Week 9 for the goal against New York, he narrowly beat out Andrés Romero for the award. After the 2013 season Osorio spent his off season training with Championship side Huddersfield Town and Bundesliga's Werder Bremen.

In the 2017 season, Osorio saw a decrease in playing time; largely appearing off the bench as a result of the signing of Víctor Vázquez. However he started both legs of the MLS Eastern Conference Final against the Columbus Crew, as well as the 2017 MLS Cup, a game which Toronto won 2–0 over the Seattle Sounders at BMO Field, on December 9. After a strong start to the 2018 season, it was reported that Osorio had received interest from clubs in Europe and Mexico. He went on to win the golden boot of the 2018 CONCACAF Champions League netting 4 goals in the process. In the first leg of the 2018 Canadian Championship final, held on August 8, Osorio scored in a 2–2 away draw against Vancouver Whitecaps. In the second leg, on August 15, his 200th appearance for the club, he set-up Sebastian Giovinco's goal in a 5–2 home win, which enabled Toronto to win the title 7–4 on aggregate. Osorio was awarded the George Gross Memorial Trophy as the most valuable player of the tournament, having scored three goals in four games in the competition. He signed a multi-year contract extension with Toronto on August 30, 2018, which made him one of the highest paid Canadian players in the world. 

On November 10, 2019, Osorio featured for Toronto in a 3–1 away defeat to Seattle Sounders in the 2019 MLS Cup Final; the opening goal, which was scored by Kelvin Leerdam, was surrounded by controversy, however, as Osorio had lost possession in the lead-up to the goal, after being involved in a collision with Cristian Roldan, which went unpunished by the referee; Osorio later accused Roldan of obstructing him. Upon completion of the 2021 season, Osorio's option for the 2022 season would be picked up by Toronto.

On April 24, 2022, in a regular-season match against New York City FC, Osorio reached 300 appearances for Toronto, becoming the first player ever to do so for the club. At the conclusion of the season, Osorio's contract with Toronto FC expired, with the player confirming that "Everything's an option at this point" in regards to his next move.

In December 2022, Toronto announced Osorio had agreed to a new three-year contract, with an option for 2026.

International career 
When he was 18 he made his debut with the Canada U20, representing Canada at the 2011 CONCACAF under-20 championship in Guatemala. Osorio has represented Canada at various youth levels.

On May 23, 2013, Osorio earned his first called up to the Canadian senior team for a friendly in the following week against Costa Rica. Osorio made his senior international debut on May 28, 2013, coming on as a second-half substitute for Samuel Piette in a 1–0 defeat to Costa Rica at  Commonwealth Stadium. On June 27, 2013, Osorio was listed as a part of the confirmed 23-man squad for Colin Miller's Canada squad for 2013 CONCACAF Gold Cup. He would also represent Canada at the 2015 CONCACAF Gold Cup, where Canada was eliminated in the group stage.

Osorio scored his first goal for Canada against Bermuda in a friendly on January 22, 2017. Osorio was named to Canada's 2017 CONCACAF Gold Cup squad on June 27, 2017. Osorio was named to his fourth Gold Cup squad on May 30, 2019, ahead of the 2019 edition. In July 2021 Osorio was named to the squad for the 2021 CONCACAF Gold Cup.

On October 7, 2021, during a 2022 FIFA World Cup qualification match, Osorio scored a goal against Mexico in an eventual 1–1 draw. The goal was the first that Canada had scored against Mexico at Estadio Azteca since 1980. In November 2022, Osorio was named to Canada's 26-man squad for the 2022 FIFA World Cup. He made his debut as a substitute in Canada's opening game, a 1-0 defeat to Belgium.

Personal life 
Osorio's parents are Colombian – his father is a native of Cali, while his mother was born in Medellín. Osorio's younger brothers, Anthony and Nicholas, previously played for Toronto FC II.

Career statistics

Club

International

International goals 
Scores and results list Canada's goal tally first.

Honours 

Toronto FC
 MLS Cup: 2017
 Supporters' Shield: 2017
 Eastern Conference Championship (Playoffs): 2016, 2017, 2019
 Canadian Championship: 2016, 2017, 2018
 Trillium Cup: 2014, 2016, 2017, 2019, 2020, 2021

Individual
 Canadian Soccer League Rookie of the Year: 2012
 CONCACAF Champions League Golden Boot: 2018
 CONCACAF Champions League Best XI: 2018
 George Gross Memorial Trophy: 2018
 Red Patch Boys Player of the Year: 2018

References

External links
 
 

1992 births
Association football midfielders
Canada men's youth international soccer players
Canada men's international soccer players
Canadian Soccer League (1998–present) players
Canadian soccer players
Canadian people of Colombian descent
Living people
Major League Soccer players
Soccer players from Brampton
Soccer players from Toronto
Toronto FC players
SC Toronto players
2013 CONCACAF Gold Cup players
2015 CONCACAF Gold Cup players
2017 CONCACAF Gold Cup players
2019 CONCACAF Gold Cup players
2021 CONCACAF Gold Cup players
2022 FIFA World Cup players
Designated Players (MLS)